Josep Maria Puig Doria (died 2006) was a Spanish jeweler. He received the Creu de Sant Jordi Award from Jordi Pujol in 2002.

References

Year of birth missing
2006 deaths
Spanish jewellers